Jose Teves Garrovillo Jr. (born in Dipolog, Zamboanga del Norte) Better known as Boboy Garrovillo, is a Filipino singer, composer, television host, and actor. He is known as one of the members of the popular musical trio APO Hiking Society along with Danny Javier and Jim Paredes. Regarded as one of the pillars and icons of Original Pilipino Music (OPM)

Personal life
Garrovillo was born in Dipolog, Zamboanga del Norte to Jose Garrovillo Sr. and Paulita Teves, sister of Senator Lorenzo Teves and aunt of the former Secretary of Finance, Margarito Teves. He is married to Elizabeth "Bong" Agcaoili and they  have two sons, Alfonso and Antonio. Just like his fellow APO bandmates, he went to study at Ateneo de Manila high school. In college, he took an economics course at the Ateneo de Manila University.

Filmography

Television 
 Sa Linggo nAPO Sila (ABS-CBN, 1989–1995)
 Sang Linggo nAPO Sila (ABS-CBN, 1995–1998)
Mr. Kupido (ABS-CBN, 1992–1995)
Sabado Live (ABS-CBN, 1998–1999)
Ang Pinaka (Q, 2005)
Marimar (GMA Network, 2007)
Celebrity Duets: Philippine Edition season 1 (GMA Network, 2007)
Nagsimula sa Puso (ABS-CBN, 2009)
Talentadong Pinoy (TV5, 2010)
Diva (GMA Network,  2010)
Precious Hearts Romances Presents: Mana Po (ABS-CBN, 2011)
The Jose and Wally Show Starring Vic Sotto (TV5, 2011)
Alice Bungisngis and her Wonder Walis (GMA Network, 2012)
Aso ni San Roque (GMA Network, 2012) as Noah
Annaliza (ABS-CBN, 2013)
Ipaglaban Mo: Ang Pangako Mo Sa Akin (ABS-CBN, 2014)
Hawak Kamay (ABS-CBN, 2014)
Pepito Manaloto (GMA Network, 2015)
Pangako Sa 'Yo (ABS-CBN, 2015)
Ipaglaban Mo: Nakaw Na Sandali (ABS-CBN, 2015)
Langit Lupa (ABS-CBN, 2016)
Tubig at Langis (ABS-CBN, 2016)
Tadhana (GMA Network, 2017)
Dear Uge (GMA Network, 2017) 
Sana Dalawa ang Puso (ABS-CBN, 2018)
Sino ang May Sala?: Mea Culpa (ABS-CBN, 2019)
Hanggang sa Dulo ng Buhay Ko (GMA Network, 2019)
First Yaya (GMA Network, 2021)
First Lady  (GMA Network, 2022)
Unica Hija (GMA Network, 2022)

Movies

References

External links
Official website

Living people
20th-century Filipino male actors
20th-century Filipino male singers
21st-century Filipino male actors
21st-century Filipino male singers
Filipino singer-songwriters
APO Hiking Society members
Filipino male film actors
Filipino male television actors
Filipino television variety show hosts
ABS-CBN personalities
GMA Network personalities
Year of birth missing (living people)
People from Dipolog